Ariotti is an Italian surname. Notable people with this surname include:

 Alison Ariotti (nee Fletcher, born 1980), Australian journalist and news presenter
 Eliseo Antonio Ariotti (born 1948), Italian diplomatic of the Holy See and former Apostolic Nuncio to Paraguay 

Italian-language surnames